He is the husband of actress Mao Ichimichi,
 is a Japanese actor best known for his role as Captain Marvelous/Gokai Red in the 2011 Super Sentai series Kaizoku Sentai Gokaiger.

Filmography

TV Drama

Films

Stageplay
Fushigi Yuugi (2010) - Tasuki
31.5 million seconds and little (2013) - Naoto Kawahara

Books
Color (2011)
Home Ground (2014)

References

External links

1988 births
Living people
People from Tateyama, Chiba
Japanese male actors
Actors from Chiba Prefecture